Seljuki Khatun or Saljuqi Khatun was a Seljuk Turkish princess of Rum, daughter of sultan Kilij Arslan II and wife of Abbasid caliph al-Nasir.

Biography
Seljuki Khatun was a daughter of sultan of Rum, Kilij Arslan II. She had eleven brothers,including future sultan Kaykhusraw I, and two older sisters. She spent her childhood at her father's court in Konya.

She married Caliph al-Nasir in 1186. Right after her betrothal to him, he sent an escort to bring her to Baghdad, consummated the marriage, and gave her priceless jewels and gifts.

Seljuki died two years later in 1188. Caliph al-Nasir was so grief-stricken at her passing that he could not eat or drink for days. For many years her house was left just as it was, with all of its draperies and furnishings intact; it was never opened, nor was anything ever taken from it.

References

Sources
 
 

1188 deaths
Seljuk dynasty
12th-century Turkic people
12th-century women from the Abbasid Caliphate
Wives of Abbasid caliphs